John James Robertson (23 May 1898 – 6 October 1955) was a Scottish Labour Party politician who served as a Member of Parliament from 1945 to 1951.

Born in Shetland, Robertson was first elected at the 1945 general election, as the Member of Parliament for Berwick and Haddington. Following boundary changes, he was returned to the House of Commons at the 1950 general election for the new constituency of Berwick and East Lothian. The following year, Robertson lost his seat at the 1951 general election to the Unionist candidate, William Anstruther-Gray.

References

External links 
 

1898 births
1955 deaths
Scottish Labour MPs
UK MPs 1945–1950
UK MPs 1950–1951
Politics of East Lothian
Politics of the Scottish Borders
Ministers in the Attlee governments, 1945–1951